Gabriel Cruceru (born 6 June 1989) is a Romanian former footballer who played as a right back for teams such as Jiul Petroșani, Ceahlăul Piatra Neamț, FC U Craiova or Minerul Motru, among others.

References

External links
 
 

1989 births
Living people
People from Gorj County
Romanian footballers
Association football defenders
Liga I players
Liga II players
Liga III players
CSM Jiul Petroșani players
FC Gloria Buzău players
CS Gaz Metan Mediaș players
CSM Ceahlăul Piatra Neamț players
CSU Voința Sibiu players
SCM Râmnicu Vâlcea players
FC U Craiova 1948 players
CS Minerul Motru players